Scatcherd is a surname, and may refer to:

 Alice Cliff Scatcherd (1842–1906), British suffragist
 Elisabeth Yvonne Scatcherd, original name of French actress Yvonne Furneaux
 Felicia Rudolphina Scatcherd (1862–1927), journalist and spiritualist
 John Scatcherd (1800–1858), Canadian farmer, merchant and political figure 
 Robert Colin Scatcherd (1832–1879), Canadian lawyer and political figure
 Thomas Scatcherd (1823–1876), Canadian lawyer and political figure

de:Scatcherd